Säve is a locality situated in Göteborg Municipality, Västra Götaland County, Sweden. It had 743 inhabitants in 2010.

The origin of the name Säve is the Old Swedish word "sjöe" (Modern Swedish "sjö"), meaning "lake".

See also
 F 9 Säve military airbase
 Gothenburg City Airport
 Säve Church
 Tuve

References 

Populated places in Västra Götaland County
Populated places in Gothenburg Municipality
Hisingen